Jack Stoll (born January 28, 1998) is an American football tight end for the Philadelphia Eagles of the National Football League (NFL). Stoll played college football at Nebraska and was signed by the Eagles as an undrafted free agent following the 2021 NFL Draft.

Early life and education
Jack Stoll was born on January 28, 1998, in Lone Tree, Colorado. He went to high school at Regis Jesuit High School, earning all-state honors his senior year. He caught 32 catches for 434 yards with 6 touchdowns, while also being named Blue-Grey All-American. Stoll was ranked 9th in the nation among tight ends by ESPN.com. He received scholarship offers from Air Force, Colorado, Colorado State, New Mexico, Texas and Wyoming but instead chose Nebraska.

Stoll redshirted his first year at Nebraska. In his second year, he played in 12 games as a freshmen redshirt, catching 8 passes for 89 yards and scoring two touchdowns. He started in all 12 games his sophomore year, and led all Cornhusker tight ends with 21 receptions for 245 yards and three touchdowns. He would start every game in his junior year as well, with 25 catches for 234 yards. Stoll battled injuries in his senior year, only playing in 7 games, starting one. He chose to forgo remaining eligibility and instead declared for the 2021 NFL Draft.

Professional career

Stoll went unselected in the draft and was subsequently signed by the Philadelphia Eagles. He was reportedly given the largest contract of the Eagles' undrafted free agents. Stoll was kept at roster cuts, becoming the only 2021 undrafted free agent to make the Eagles' roster. He made his debut in week one, appearing on 12 offensive snaps during the 32–6 win over the Atlanta Falcons. He was placed on the COVID list on January 3, 2022. He was activated one week later on January 10, missing just one game where the Eagles did not play their starters as they had already clinched a playoff spot.

After posting four receptions for 22 yards in his rookie year, Stoll started 11 games in 2022 and recorded 11 catches for 123 yards. Stoll reached Super Bowl LVII. In the Super Bowl, Stoll recorded 1 tackle on special teams but the Eagles lost 38-35 to the Kansas City Chiefs.

References

1998 births
Living people
American football tight ends
Nebraska Cornhuskers football players
Philadelphia Eagles players